East West University (also known as EWU), is a private university located in Aftabnagar, Dhaka of Bangladesh. It was established in 1996 under the Private University Act of 1992.

History 
The culture of private universities in Bangladesh started in the early 1990s. During that period, the government felt that the existing public universities were not sufficient to meet the demand for tertiary education in the country. Moreover, to maintain their quality of education, most of the public universities in Bangladesh kept themselves selective and as a result, each year a large number of students failed to get admitted into higher educational institutions.

These issues led the government to permit the establishment of private universities, and on 9 August 1992, the Private University Act (Act 34) 1992 was passed.

East West University was established in 1996 as a non-profit organization. The university is the first major project of the Progoti Foundation for Education and Development (PFED), a non-profit, non-political, charitable organization maintained by a group of academics, business leaders, professionals and education enthusiasts led by Mohammed Farashuddin, economist and former governor of Bangladesh Bank.

BBA, BSc in computer science and BA in English at the previous campus at 45, Mohakhali Commercial Area, Dhaka. The university has some 10,400 students, in its Aftab Nagar Campus, Dhaka.

List of vice-chancellors 
 Professor M.M. Shahidul Hassan ( present. )

Campus

In May 2012, the university shifted to its permanent campus. The permanent campus of East West University is located in Aftabnagar, Rampura on the Progoti Sarani close to Bangladesh Television on 7.4 bighas of land. Total floor area of the 9 storied university complex is 4,58,957.04 square feet with modern facilities.

East West University has also bought 5.95 acres of land at Mouja: Vadham, P.S Tongi, District: Gazipur. In addition, it has received an allotment of one bigha of land at Uttara from RAJUK.

Library

East West University has a library covering about 11000 sq ft. in the new campus with maps and journal area, and has a photocopy corner, database search corner, and newspaper display section. Each day around 2,200 users visit the library. The library contains 22,000 books, a subscription to 135 international and national journals (hardcopy), 3,300 online journals on its database, subscription to 16 national daily newspapers and around 1,500 CD-ROMs and audio cassettes.

Laboratories
There are laboratories for engineering and science disciplines, and nine computer laboratories with a local network of around 600 PCs and personal VSAT services, if not more. Universities laboratories are shared as follow:
 Computer Communications Laboratories, shared by all departments,
 Digital Systems Laboratory, shared by the engineering departments,
 Electronics Laboratory, shared by the engineering departments,.
 Electrical Circuits and Machine Laboratory, used by the EEE department,
 Network Laboratory, shared by department of CSE and APCE,
 Pharmacy Laboratory, used by department of Pharmacy,
 Physics Laboratory, used by all the science and engineering departments,
 Telecommunication Laboratory, used by the APCE department,
 VLSI Laboratory, shared by CSE and EEE departments,
 Software Engineering Laboratory, shared by only CSE department.
 Database Laboratory, shared by CSE department.
 Artificial Intelligence Laboratory, shared by CSE department.

Structure
East West University has three academic faculties. Each faculty has departments. A dean is the head of each faculty, while departments are headed by chairpersons. The Department of Business Administration is the largest and one of the oldest departments of the university. The Department of Computer Science and the Department of English are the two other founding departments.

 Faculty of Sciences and Engineering
 Department of Computer Science & Engineering
 Department of Electrical & Electronic Engineering
 Department of Electronics & Communications Engineering
 Department of Pharmacy
 Department of Mathematical & Physical Sciences
 Department of Genetic Engineering and Biotechnology
 Department of Civil Engineering
 Faculty of Business and Economics
 Department of Business Administration
 Department of Economics
 Department of MBA/EMBA/MBM Programs
 Faculty of Liberal Arts and Social Sciences
 Department of English
 Department of Social Relations
 Department of Sociology
 Department of Law
 Department of Information Studies & Library Management

Academics

Financial support

Merit scholarships
East West University provides scholarships starting from full funding to partial tuition waivers. Each semester the top 10% students of each batch having a CGPA of 3.97 or above are awarded EWU Merit Scholarships which are worth 90,000 BDT at the undergraduate level and 75,000 BDT at the postgraduate level. All other students from the Dean's List  are also eligible to receive Medha Lalon Fund Scholarship ranging from 500,000 BDT to 25,000 BDT. Besides, there are 28 directorial scholarships (25,000-20,000 BDT) are available each year for the meritorious students with exceptional case.

Financial aid
Each semester the university provides financial aid. Students facing financial difficulties (with a CGPA of 3.7 and above, those students who complete at least 30 credits last three semester) can apply once a year for support. It varies from 18,000 BDT to 35,000 BDT. EWU provides 50% tuition waiver for any one of a sibling pair studying simultaneously in the university which is worth around 45,000 BDT per year. It maintains a low tuition fees rate (BDT 4,900 per credit) compared to other leading private universities in Bangladesh. Tuition fees depends on department

Degrees and awards
EWU offers Bachelor of Arts (BA) for English graduate, Bachelor of Business Administration (BBA) for Business graduate and Bachelor of Social Science (BSS) for Economics graduate. There are degrees in Business and Economics together in the form of double major. The university offers Bachelor of Science (B.Sc.) for Engineering  (e.g. Computer Science) for Science graduate, Bachelor of Pharmacy (B.Phrm.) for Pharmacy graduate, Bachelor of Science in Genetic Engineering & Biotechnology and Bachelor of Science in Applied Statistics.

The B.Sc. in EEE program has been granted accreditation from the Board of Accreditation for Engineering & Technical Education (BAETE). At the post-graduate level EWU offers Master of Business Administration (MBA) for business, Master of Arts (MA) for humanities and Master of Science (MS) for science and engineering, Master of Pharmacy (M.Pharm.) for pharmacy. EWU's B.Pharm. and M.Pharm. programs are accredited by the Pharmacy Council of Bangladesh.Most EWU degrees, especially business and engineering degrees, are transferable to North American, European and Australasian universities where formal collaboration exists with them.

EWU graduates are evaluated on Cumulative Grade Point Average (CGPA) on a scale of 0 to 4 points. In addition, the university classifies students into three classes based on their earned CGPA. These are as follow:
First Class - CGPA 3.00 and above
Second Class - CGPA 2.50 to 2.99
Third Class - CGPA 2.00 to 2.49

The university provides the following awards to its outstanding students.
Gold medal : The Chancellor of the university awards a gold medal to each of the students having a CGPA of 3.97 or above on the day of convocation.
Summa cum laude: Each undergraduate student with a CGPA of 3.90 or above is awarded summa cum laude by the university and declared by the convocation marshall on the convocation day.
Magna cum laude: Each undergraduate student with a CGPA of 3.75 or above is awarded magna cum laude by the university and declared by the convocation marshall on the convocation day.

Term dates

East West University is modeled on the North American Open Credit system. It maintains tri-semester (three semesters) year with the exception of the Department of Pharmacy which maintains a bi-semester (two semesters) year. East West University semesters are as follow:
Spring: January - April (starting on the second week of January)
Summer: May - August (starting on the second week of May)
Fall: September - December (starting on the second week of September)

Note: These dates may change due to any changes that occur in the academic calendar provided by East West University Authorities.

Grading policy

Ranking
In 2020, EWU has been ranked #3549 in the world and #14 among the 166 universities in Bangladesh by the Webometrics Ranking of World Universities. The ranking is based on the university's web presence and visibility.  According to IDEAS ranking of Economic Research Institutions in Bangladesh, the Department of Economics of East West University ranked 2nd in Bangladesh since 2014 (next to the Bangladesh Institute of Development Studies).  Star researcher from East West University is Dr. Syed Abul Basher who has topped the list of young Economists from Bangladesh.  IDEAS database contains information on 13,177 economics institutions, 43,324 authors with over 1,046,994 research publications in 94 fields.

Research
East West University has a resource Center for Research and Training (EWUCRT). The center creates knowledge through academic and applied research and disseminate knowledge through training and publication. CRT operates through a Research Committee composed of representatives from the Board, Deans and Chairs of the Academic Department.

CRT publishes the EWU Journal, a bi-annual publication of research papers. CRT publishes working papers, occasional papers and Annual Research Abstracts. Faculty members and senior students of the university produce academic papers each year and publish them in journals and conference proceedings.

In addition, CRT works with the government and private institutions at national and international levels to facilitate academic exchanges.

In 2002 EWU organized International Conference on Computer and Information Technology which is a series of Computer Science ofand Information Technology based conference hosted in Bangladesh since 1997 by a university each year. EWU is a member of Trade Knowledge Network, a collaboration of research institutions in developed and developing countries located in Africa, Asia, Europe and the Americas and also active in the South Asian Network for Development and Environmental Economists (SANDEE). Dr A.K. Enamul Haque, Professor of Economics, is a member of the board of SANDEE and an academic advisor to SANDEE researchers.

In 2006, EWU faculty members had 39 appearances in international journals and conferences. Besides these, the university provides financial support through a faculty research program to promote research culture in the campus.

Convocation 
East West University holds a convocation every year in Dhaka. The first was held in Osmani Memorial Hall. After that, through 2011, the ceremony was held at the Bangabandhu International Conference Center, except in 2006, when it took place in the Winter Garden convention hall at the Dhaka Sheraton Hotel. From 2012, it moved to the university's new campus in Aftab Nagar. In accordance with the Private University Act, the President of Bangladesh, as chancellor, or his nominee presides at convocation. Education Minister Nurul Islam Nahid presided in 2009, 2013, and 2014. Minister for Agriculture Matia Chowdhury presided in 2012.

The 1st convocation was in 2002. Earl H. Potter III, Dean of the College of Business, Eastern Michigan University, delivered the convocation speech. Degrees were conferred on 85 undergraduate and 11 graduate students.

The 2nd convocation was in 2003. Professor of economics Wahiduddin Mahmud delivered the convocation speech. 161 students graduated.

The 3rd convocation was in 2004. Former Chief Justice Mustafa Kamal delivered the convocation address. 268 students graduated.

The 4th convocation was in 2005. Former Vice Chancellor of Jahangirnagar University Zillur Rahman Siddiqui, delivered the convocation speech. 387 students graduated.

The 5th convocation was in 2006. Economist Rehman Sobhan delivered the convocation address. 416 students graduated.

The 6th convocation was in 2007. Professor Emeritus of physics Jamal Nazrul Islam delivered the convocation speech. 644 students graduated.

The 7th convocation was held on 3 March 2008. Former Chief Justice Muhammad Habibur Rahman delivered the convocation speech. Degrees were bestowed on 604 undergraduate and 275 graduate students. Two students were awarded gold medals for outstanding academic performance.

The 8th convocation was held on 7 April 2009. Distinguished professor of Bengali literature Anisuzzaman delivered the convocation speech. Degrees were bestowed on 671 undergraduate and 252 graduate students. Seven students received gold medals.

The 9th convocation took place on 25 April 2010. Professor Emeritus of English Serajul Islam Choudhury delivered the convocation address. Degrees were conferred on 956 students. Six students were awarded gold medals.

The 10th convocation took place on 6 March 2011. Vice Chancellor of University of Dhaka AAMS Arefin Siddique delivered the convocation speech. Degrees were bestowed on 712 undergraduate and 361 graduate students.

The 11th convocation was held on 7 March 2012. Abdullah Abu Sayeed, President of Bishwa Sahitya Kendra (World Literature Center), delivered the convocation speech. Degrees were bestowed on 643 undergraduate and 475 graduate students.

The 12th convocation was held on 27 February 2013. Sufia Ahmed, Ekushey Padak awardee for contributions to flourishing culture and the Language Movement, delivered the convocation speech. Degrees were bestowed on 1,279 students. Three students received gold medals.

The 13th convocation was held on 24 February 2014. Novelist Selina Hossain, recipient of the Ekushey Padak for literature, delivered the convocation speech. Degrees were conferred on 1,341 students. Four students were awarded gold medals.

The 14th convocation took place on 19 March 2015. Civil rights activist Sultana Kamal delivered the convocation address. Degrees were conferred on 1,455 students. Two students were awarded gold medals.

The 15th convocation took place on Wednesday, 27 January 2016 at East West University, Aftabnagar, Dhaka. Author, physicist, professor and activist Muhammed Zafar Iqbal delivered the convocation speech. Degrees were conferred on 1,311 students. Three students were awarded gold medals.

Notable alumni
 Rubana Huq 
 Afran Nisho

Notes and references

External links

 Official website

Private universities in Bangladesh
Educational institutions established in 1996
Universities and colleges in Dhaka
1996 establishments in Bangladesh